The Norwell Village Area Historic District encompasses the village center of Norwell, Massachusetts. It is centered on the town common, first laid out in the 1640s, around which a number of public buildings are located, and radiates away along Main, Central, West, River, and Dover Streets. There are 34 buildings in the district, predominantly residential and representing a cross-section of architectural styles from the 18th to the early 20th centuries. Prominent buildings include the 1830 First Parish Church, the 1874 Italianate-style James Library building, and the 1934 Colonial Revival Cushing Memorial Town Hall.

The district was added to the National Register of Historic Places in 1982.

See also
National Register of Historic Places listings in Plymouth County, Massachusetts

References

Historic districts in Plymouth County, Massachusetts
Norwell, Massachusetts
National Register of Historic Places in Plymouth County, Massachusetts
Historic districts on the National Register of Historic Places in Massachusetts